Sphenacodontia is a stem-based clade of derived synapsids. It was defined by Amson and Laurin (2011) as "the largest clade that includes Haptodus baylei, Haptodus garnettensis and Sphenacodon ferox, but not Edaphosaurus pogonias". They first appear during the Late Pennsylvanian (Upper Carboniferous) epoch. From the end of the Carboniferous to the end of the Permian, most of them remained large, with only some secondarily becoming small in size.

Basal Sphenacodontia constitute a transitional evolutionary series from early pelycosaurs to ancestral therapsids (which in turn were the ancestors of more advanced forms and finally the mammals). One might say that the sphenacodontians are proto-therapsids (even though there is almost a 30-million-years gap between the separation of the ancestors of therapsids from other sphenacodontians and the first appearance of therapsids in the fossil record).

Characteristics
The defining characteristics include a thickening of the maxilla visible on its internal surface, above the large front (caniniform) teeth; and the premaxillary teeth being set in deep sockets. All other (sister group and more primitive) synapsid clades have teeth that are set in shallow sockets.

Classification

The following taxonomy follows Fröbisch et al. (2011), Benson (2012) and Spinder (2016) unless otherwise noted.

Class Synapsida
 Eupelycosauria
 Sphenacodontia
 †Haptodus
 †Hypselohaptodus
 Pantherapsida
 †Kenomagnathus
 †Tetraceratops
 †Palaeohatteriidae
 Sphenacodontoidea
 †Sphenacodontidae
 Therapsida

See also
 Evolution of mammals

References

 Laurin, M. and Reisz, R. R., 1997, Autapomorphies of the main clades of synapsids - Tree of Life Web Project

External links
 Synapsida: Sphenacodontia

 
Extant Pennsylvanian first appearances
Taxa named by Llewellyn Ivor Price
Taxa named by Alfred Romer